Baeturia is a genus of cicadas in the family Cicadidae. There are at least 60 described species in Baeturia.

Species
These 68 species belong to the genus Baeturia:

 Baeturia arabuensis Blote, 1960 c g
 Baeturia bemmeleni Boer, 1994 c g
 Baeturia bicolorata Distant, 1892 c g
 Baeturia bilebanarai Boer, 1989 c g
 Baeturia bipunctata Blote, 1960 c g
 Baeturia biroi Boer, 1994 c g
 Baeturia bismarkensis Boer, 1989 c g
 Baeturia bloetei Boer, 1989 c g
 Baeturia boulardi Boer, 1989 c g
 Baeturia brandti Boer, 1989 c g
 Baeturia brongersmai Blote, 1960 c g
 Baeturia colossea Boer, 1994 c g
 Baeturia conviva (Stål, 1861) c g
 Baeturia cristovalensis Boer, 1989 c g
 Baeturia daviesi Boer, 1994 c g
 Baeturia edauberti Boulard, 1979 c g
 Baeturia exhausta (Guerin-Meneville, 1831) c g
 Baeturia fortuini Boer, 1994 c g
 Baeturia furcillata Boer, 1992 c g
 Baeturia galeata Boer, 2000 c g
 Baeturia gibberosa Boer, 1994 c g
 Baeturia gressitti Boer, 1989 c g
 Baeturia guttulinervis Blote, 1960 c g
 Baeturia guttulipennis Blote, 1960 c g
 Baeturia hamiltoni Boer, 1994 c g
 Baeturia hardyi Boer, 1986 c g
 Baeturia hartonoi Boer, 1994 c g
 Baeturia inconstans Boer, 1994 c g
 Baeturia intermedia Boer, 1982 c g
 Baeturia karkarensis Boer, 1992 c g
 Baeturia laminifer Blote, 1960 c g
 Baeturia laperousei Boulard, 2005 c g
 Baeturia laureli Boer, 1986 c g
 Baeturia lorentzi Boer, 1992 c g
 Baeturia loriae Distant, 1897 c g
 Baeturia maai Boer, 1994 c g
 Baeturia macgillavryi Boer, 1989 c g
 Baeturia maddisoni Duffels, 1988 c g
 Baeturia mamillata Blote, 1960 c g
 Baeturia manusensis Boer, 1989 c g
 Baeturia marginata Boer, 1989 c g
 Baeturia marmorata Blote, 1960 c g
 Baeturia mendanai Boer, 1989 c g
 Baeturia mussauensis Boer, 1989 c g
 Baeturia nasuta Blote, 1960 c g
 Baeturia papuensis Boer, 1989 c g
 Baeturia parva Blote, 1960 c g
 Baeturia pigrami Boer, 1994 c g
 Baeturia polhemi Boer, 2000 c g
 Baeturia quadrifida (Walker, F., 1868) c g
 Baeturia reijnhoudti Boer, 1989 c g
 Baeturia retracta Boer, 1994 c g
 Baeturia roonensis Boer, 1994 c g
 Baeturia rossi Boer, 1994 c g
 Baeturia rotumae Duffels, 1988 c g
 Baeturia rufula Blote, 1960 c g
 Baeturia schulzi Schmidt, E., 1926 c g
 Baeturia sedlacekorum Boer, 1989 c g
 Baeturia silveri Boer, 1994 c g
 Baeturia splendida Boer, 1994 c g
 Baeturia tenuispina Blote, 1960 c g
 Baeturia turgida Boer, 1992 c g
 Baeturia uveiensis Boulard, 1996 c g
 Baeturia vanderhammeni Blote, 1960 c g
 Baeturia versicolor Boer, 1994 c g
 Baeturia viridis Blote, 1960 c g
 Baeturia wauensis Boer, 1994 c g
 Baeturia wegeneri Boer, 1994 c g

Data sources: i = ITIS, c = Catalogue of Life, g = GBIF, b = Bugguide.net

References

Further reading

 
 
 
 

Chlorocystini
Cicadidae genera